Deshabandhu Bidyapith HS High School, Hojai was established in 1950 and it is managed by the Department of Education. It is located in Urban area. It is located in Hojai district of Assam.

Departments

Science
 Botany
 Chemistry
 Geography
 Geology
 Mathematics
 Physics
 Statistics
 Zoology
 English
 Hindi
 Assamese
 Bengali

External links
 Deshbandhu Bidyapith Hss High School, Nagaon - Address, Reviews, Admissions and Fees 2021

References

Education in Assam
Universities and colleges in Assam
Educational institutions established in 1950
1950 establishments in Assam